The Caudron C.870 was a training aircraft built by Caudron in the early 1940s.

It was a low-wing monoplane of all-metal construction. Although two prototypes were built, the C.870 was not put into series production.

Specifications

References

Further reading

1940s French military trainer aircraft
Single-engined tractor aircraft
C.870
Low-wing aircraft
Aircraft first flown in 1940